Michael Elliott,  (30 September 1924 – 17 October 2007) was a chemist and Lawes Trust Senior Fellow at Rothamsted Experimental Station who invented and commercialised the development of novel insecticides known as pyrethroids.

Education
Elliott was educated at The Skinners' School in Tunbridge Wells and the University of Southampton where he was awarded Bachelor of Science and Doctor of Philosophy degrees.

Research and career
Elliott led the team that invented the major pyrethroid insecticides bioresmethrin, permethrin, cypermethrin and deltamethrin. In 2009 it was estimated that pyrethroid-treated mosquito nets significantly decreased the number of deaths due to malaria.

Awards and honours
Elliott was elected a Fellow of the Royal Society (FRS) in 1979 and appointed Commander of the Order of the British Empire (CBE) in 1982. He was awarded the Wolf Prize in Agriculture in 1989.

References

1924 births
2007 deaths
Alumni of the University of Southampton
Commanders of the Order of the British Empire
Fellows of King's College London
Fellows of the Royal Society
Pesticides in the United Kingdom
Rothamsted Experimental Station people
Wolf Prize in Agriculture laureates
British chemists
Foreign associates of the National Academy of Sciences